Buenavista is a station on the Mexico City Metro, in the Colonia Buenavista neighborhood of the Cuauhtémoc borough.  It is the southwestern terminal station of Line B (the green-on-silver line, Buenavista-Ciudad Azteca).  It also offers connections to the Insurgentes Metrobús bus rapid transit line. In 2019, the station had an average ridership of 66,804 passengers per day, making it the tenth busiest station in the network.

Name and pictogram
The station logo represents the front of an ALCO type diesel locomotive. Its name comes from the nearby  Estación Buenavista (Buenavista railway station) main line railway station, which closed its doors to passenger traffic in 1999, but then reopened for the new Tren Suburbano in 2008.  The metro station was opened on 15 December 1999.

General information

In December 1999, the Buenavista metro station was opened as part of the first stretch of Line B, going from Buenavista to Villa de Aragón.

Near Buenavista is the central administrative building of the Cuauhtémoc borough local government, the library Biblioteca Vasconcelos, and on Saturday mornings only the Tianguis Cultural del Chopo, a flea market dedicated to youth culture (mostly music), and Forum Buenavista shopping mall.

As of 2020, Buenavista offers connections with the Ferrocarril Suburbano, a commuter rail that has Cuautitlán in the State of Mexico as final destination. Also, users can connect with Lines 1, 3 and 4 of the Metrobús, a bus rapid transit network.

Ridership

References

External links 

1999 establishments in Mexico
Mexico City Metro Line B stations
Railway stations opened in 1999
Mexico City Metro stations in Cuauhtémoc, Mexico City
Accessible Mexico City Metro stations